Yakhfervazan (also Romanized as Yakhfervazān, Yakhfarvazān, and Yakh Forūzān) is a village in Owch Hacha Rural District, in the Central District of Ahar County, East Azerbaijan Province, Iran. At the 2006 census, its population was 503, in 127 families.

References 

Populated places in Ahar County